The 2022–23 Minnesota Golden Gophers women's basketball team represented the University of Minnesota during the 2022–23 NCAA Division I women's basketball season. The Golden Gophers, led by fifth-year head coach Lindsay Whalen, played their home games at Williams Arena and compete as members of the Big Ten Conference.

Previous season
The Golden Gophers finished the 2021–2022 season with a 14–17 record and 7–11 in Big Ten play to finish in tenth place. As the tenth seed in the Big Ten tournament, they were defeated by Northwestern in the Second Round. They were not invited to the NCAA Tournament, but were chosen as an at-large team for the WNIT. They lost in the 2nd Round of the WNIT to the eventual champions, South Dakota State.

Offseason

Departures

Arrivals

2022 Recruiting class
The Gophers signed 4 players from the state of Minnesota for their 2022 Class.

Roster

Schedule and results

|-
! colspan=6 style=| Exhibition

|-
! colspan=6 style=| Regular Season

|-
! colspan=6 style=| Big Ten Tournament

Source

Rankings

References

Minnesota Golden Gophers women's basketball seasons
Minnesota
Minnesota Golden Gophers women's basketball team
Minnesota Golden Gophers women's basketball team